Buchosa District, is a district in the Mwanza Region in the southern coastal Tanzania. The district is on the south shore of Lake Victoria west of the city of Mwanza and north of the Geita Region. Much of the district is large islands in the lake. The district was established in 2015.

Geography 

The district lies on islands and the southern shore of Lake Victoria. To the east is the Sengerema District that is also in the Mwanza Region. To the south and west is the Geita District of the Geita Region. Of the  area of the district most, is water and only  is land.

Climate 

The district's climate is tropical savanna with the Aw Koppen-Geiger system classification. There are two wet seasons, and one dry season. The primary wet season is October through December, and the secondary wet seasons is March and April. The dry seasons runs from late June to early September.

Administrative areas 

The district consists of two divisions, 22 wards, 82 villages, and 410 hamlets.

Wards (2016 Population)

 Bangwe (13,102)
 Bugoro (5,124)
 Buhama (14,051)
 Bukokwa (20,072)
 Bulyaheke (39,850)
 Bupandwa (20,446)
 Iligamba (13,565)
 Irenza (13,274)
 Kafunzo (12,101)
 Kalebezo (21,357)
 Kasisa (13,982)
 Katwe (14,120)
 Kazunzu (15,841)
 Lugata (23,704)
 Luhuza (7,744)
 Maisome (18,573)
 Nyakaliro (18,035)
 Nyakasasa (2,920)
 Nyakasungwa (9,466)
 Nyanzenda (23,265)
 Nyehunge (40,242)
 Uharanyonga (8,367)

Demographics 

In 2016 the Tanzania National Bureau of Statistics report there were 369,201 people in the district, from 327.767 in 2012. The district is made up of primarily people of the Zinza, Jita, Kerewe, Kara and Sukuma tribes. The average household size in 6.9 people.

Economy 

Buchosa District's economy is mostly farming and livestock keeping at 80% of the economy being agriculture. Of that, which is 47% of arable land, is currently cultivated. Buchosa is the largest producer of maize in the regions, and second largest producer of cassava. Other food crops include sweet potatoes, and is the only district in the region to grow rice. Cash crops are maize and cotton.

Buchosa District has a significant portion of the regions forest.

The district has no large, medium or small industry. There is fishing in the district with 1,280,503 tons in 2015.

Roads 

Buchosa District has no paved roads.

Parks 

Parts of the Rubondo Island National Park is in the district. The park consists of Rubondo Island, of the Geita Region, and other nearby islands along the southern shore of Lake Victoria. Wildlife on the islands are elephants, giraffes, chimpanzees, hippopotamus, crocodiles, sitatunga, bushbucks, suni, pythons, and pigs. There are also many water birds and fish eagles in the park.

References 

Districts of Mwanza Region
Mwanza Region
Constituencies of Tanzania
Lake Victoria